The 2016 President's Cup (Maldives) Final was the 66th Final of the Maldives President's Cup.

Route to the final

Match

Details

See also
2016 President's Cup (Maldives)

References

President's Cup (Maldives) finals
Pres